Golden School  is an Armenian situation comedy television series developed by Vache Tovmasyan. The series premiered on Armenia Premium on 17 October 2017 and since then the series air on Tuesdays and Thursdays at 21:00.

Mostly, the series takes place in a school in Yerevan, Armenia.

Premise
A robber (Robert Tovmasyan) hides stolen gold at a construction site while escaping from the police. Five years later, when he is finally released from prison, he finds out that a school was built on top of the site of the buried gold. In order to find the gold, he becomes a teacher at the school. However, he falls in love with an English teacher and the flow of the series completely changes.

Cast and characters

 Vache Tovmasyan as Robert Tovmasyan, Armenian history teacher
 Sergey Sargsyan as Sirak Mnacakanyan, Maths teacher
 Anna Grigoryan as Lusine Yesayan, English teacher
 Lala Mnatsakanyan as Karakhanyan, Deputy director of the school
 Vahe Petrosyan  as Ando, Robert's best friend
 Gevorg Dodozyan as Jora, Warden of the school
 Alla Vardanyan as S. Hakobyan, Director of the school
 Ashot Meloyan as Menua Drtatyan, Geography teacher
 Liana Hakobyan as Elya Ananyan, Armenian language teacher

References

Armenia TV original programming
2010s teen sitcoms
Armenian comedy television series
Armenian-language television shows
2017 Armenian television series debuts
2010s Armenian television series